Reginald ("Reg") Plummer (born August 6, 1953 in Sudbury, Ontario) is a  field hockey player from Canada.
Plummer participated in two consecutive Summer Olympics for his native country, starting in 1976 in Montreal, Quebec, Canada. There he finished in tenth place with the Men's National Team, just like the team did in Los Angeles, California (1984). Plummer later became the president of the Canadian Field Hockey Association.

Reg Plummer is active in field hockey in Ottawa, Canada as a club coach with Outaouais Field hockey club, high school coach with Merivale High School and as a player on both club tournament teams and with the travelling Masters/Veterans international club The Fighting Haddocks.

International senior competitions

 1976 – Olympic Games, Montreal (10th)
 1984 – Olympic Games, Los Angeles (10th)

References
 Canadian Olympic Committee

External links
 
 
 
 

1953 births
Living people
Canadian male field hockey players
Field hockey players at the 1976 Summer Olympics
Field hockey players at the 1984 Summer Olympics
Olympic field hockey players of Canada
Sportspeople from Greater Sudbury
Pan American Games medalists in field hockey
Pan American Games gold medalists for Canada
Pan American Games silver medalists for Canada
Field hockey players at the 1975 Pan American Games
Field hockey players at the 1979 Pan American Games
Field hockey players at the 1983 Pan American Games
Medalists at the 1975 Pan American Games
Medalists at the 1979 Pan American Games
Medalists at the 1983 Pan American Games